is an oil-fired thermal power station operated by JERA in the city of Tahara, Aichi, Japan. The facility is located on reclaimed land at the tip of the Atsumi Peninsula at the entrance to Mikawa Bay.

History
The Atsumi Thermal Power Station was built by Chubu Electric and first came on line in 1971. A total of four generating units were completed, two in 1971 and two in 1982. Unit 1 was taken offline and mothballed in 2001 and Unit 2 was taken offline in 2004. Due to high oil prices and the cost of modernization, Unit 2 was scrapped in 2004. Unit 1 was likewise scrapped by the end of 2017. Units 3 and 4 remain in operation, but are running at very low capacity (under 25%) due to sluggish demand for electricity and lower-cost alternative sources.

Plant details

See also 

 Energy in Japan
 List of power stations in Japan

References

External links

official home page
Chubu Electric Press Release

Buildings and structures in Aichi Prefecture
1971 establishments in Japan
Energy infrastructure completed in 1971
Oil-fired power stations in Japan
Tahara, Aichi
Chubu Electric Power